Amanda Bearse (born August 9, 1958) is an American actress, comedian and director. She starred in the 1985 supernatural horror film Fright Night, and later starred as Marcy Rhoades D'Arcy in the Fox sitcom Married... with Children (1987-1997). Bearse later began working as television director, directing over 90 episodes of comedy series.

Early life
Bearse grew up in Winter Park, Florida. After she graduated from Winter Park High School in 1976, her family moved to Atlanta. She attended Rollins College, Birmingham Southern College and Young Harris College, where she received an associate of arts degree. Bearse studied acting at New York City's Neighborhood Playhouse under instructor Sanford Meisner.

Career
Bearse made her television debut playing the role of Amanda Cousins in the ABC daytime soap opera All My Children from 1982 to 1983. The following year, she had small role in the comedy film Protocol starring Goldie Hawn, and later landed a role in the sex comedy Fraternity Vacation. In 1985, Bearse played the female leading role in the supernatural horror film Fright Night. She returned to television with guest-starring role in the ABC drama series, Hotel in 1986. The following year, she was cast as Marcy Rhoades (later Marcy D'Arcy), the feminist next-door neighbor in the Fox sitcom Married... with Children opposite Ed O'Neill and Katey Sagal. The series ran to 1997; becoming one of the longest running sitcoms in television history.

Bearse studied directing at the American Film Institute and the University of Southern California. She began directing television while appearing on Married...with Children, and from 1991 to 1997, she directed 31 episodes of the show. She also directed episodes of Reba, Mad TV, Nick Freno: Licensed Teacher, Malcolm & Eddie, Pauly, The Tom Show, The Jamie Foxx Show, Dharma & Greg, Veronica's Closet, Two Guys, a Girl and a Pizza Place, Jesse (1999; starring her Married...with Children  costar Christina Applegate), Jessie (2011), and Ladies Man. In 2005, she directed The Sperm Donor, a pilot for NBC starring Maggie Wheeler. In 2006, Bearse teamed with Rosie O'Donnell to produce and direct The Big Gay Sketch Show, which debuted on Logo on April 24, 2007.

As actress, in 1990s, Bearse appeared only in two films: The Doom Generation and Here Come the Munsters (both 1995). She returned to acting in 2011, appearing in two episodes of Lifetime comedy-drama series, Drop Dead Diva. In 2020, she starred in the German comedy horror film, Sky Sharks, making her first film appearance in 25 years. In 2022, Bearse played Luke Macfarlane's mother in the romantic comedy film, Bros.

Personal life
Bearse has been publicly out as lesbian since 1993 and has an adopted daughter, Zoe.

Filmography

Film

Television

References

External links
 
 

Living people
20th-century American actresses
21st-century American actresses
American film actresses
American television actresses
American television directors
American women comedians
American women film directors
American women television directors
American lesbian actresses
Lesbian comedians
Actresses from Orlando, Florida
Comedians from Florida
LGBT people from Florida
People from Winter Park, Florida
Birmingham–Southern College alumni
Neighborhood Playhouse School of the Theatre alumni
Winter Park High School alumni
Young Harris College alumni
Film directors from Florida
20th-century American comedians
21st-century American comedians
LGBT television directors
21st-century American LGBT people
1958 births
American LGBT comedians